Ever Antonio Palacios (born 18 January 1969) is a Colombian football player, who played for a few clubs, including Deportivo Cali, Atlético Nacional, Atlético Junior, Shonan Bellmare (Japan), Kashiwa Reysol (Japan) and Boyacá Chicó.

Career
Palacios played club football with Boyacá Chicó into his forties, making him one of the oldest players in Colombian league history.

Palacios played for the Colombia national football team and was a member of the national team competing at the 1998 FIFA World Cup.

Club statistics

National team statistics

References

External links

 

1969 births
Living people
Colombian footballers
Colombian expatriate footballers
Colombia international footballers
Deportivo Cali footballers
L.D.U. Quito footballers
Atlético Nacional footballers
Atlético Junior footballers
1998 FIFA World Cup players
Categoría Primera A players
J1 League players
J2 League players
Shonan Bellmare players
Kashiwa Reysol players
Expatriate footballers in Japan
Boyacá Chicó F.C. footballers
Association football defenders
Sportspeople from Antioquia Department
Colombian people of African descent